Fragments From A Space Cadet is the debut album by Kenneth Bager for which he received the Statens Kunstfond's (The Danish Arts Foundation's) award. It was released on May 24, 2006.

Track listing 
"Fragment Six" (Speak my name) ft. Camilla Munck
"Fragment Zero" (And I kept dubbin')
"Fragment One" (And I kept Hearing) ft. Gisli
"Fragment Two" (The First Picture) ft. Julee Cruise
"Fragment Eight" (The Sound of Swing) ft. The Hellerup Cool School Choir
"Fragment Five" (Moonlight Talking) ft. Camilla Munck
"Fragment Seven" (Les Fleurs) ft. Julee Cruise
"Fragment Three" (Walther & Viola)
"Fragment Ten" (On the floor — dub) ft. Julee Cruise
"Fragment Four" (Love won't leave me alone) ft. Nikolaj Grandjean & Jean Luc Ponty
"Fragment Nine" (Would you like to seduce me?)
"Fragment Eleven" (The day after yesterday - a love story in five parts)
Part 1: The Meeting
Part 2: Traveling
Part 3: The story ft. Julee Cruise
Part 4: Reflections
Part 5: It'll never happen again ft. Julee Cruise & Syd Matters

References 

2006 debut albums